Andrew James Lewis (born February 6, 1987) is an American politician and former member of the Pennsylvania House of Representatives. He represented the 105th District from 2019 to 2022.

Early life and education 
Lewis was born on February 6, 1987, in Leonardtown, Maryland. He graduated from Greenwood School District's Home Education Program in 2005. Lewis earned a Bachelor of Arts in political science from Thomas Edison State University in 2012, Master of Arts in legislative affairs from George Washington University in 2013, and a Master of Business Administration from Temple University in 2015.

Military service
After graduating from high school in 2005, Lewis enlisted in the United States Army. He was deployed as a scout during the 2007-2008 Iraq troop surge for fifteen months in Iraq, where he experienced combat. Following his stint in Iraq, Lewis was selected as a counterintelligence agent and was stationed in South Korea for two years, during which time he was given oversight of his team. He was later assigned to the White House Communications Agency. Lewis was honorably discharge from active duty in 2015 at the rank of staff sergeant.

Political career 
Lewis was elected to represent the 105th District in the Pennsylvania House of Representatives in 2018, replacing the retiring Ronald Marsico. He was re-elected in 2020.

In May 2020, Lewis tested positive for COVID-19. His staff was notified of their exposure, as were his Republican colleagues who had been in close contact. However, Lewis himself did not publicly reveal his diagnosis until after two weeks of quarantine. Democrats in the House criticized the Republican caucus for not disclosing Lewis's diagnosis earlier, alleging Republican leadership purposely kept it secret. The events surrounding Lewis's positive test and subsequent non-disclosure led to new COVID protocol in the state house.

In 2020, Lewis was among 26 Pennsylvania House Republicans who called for the reversal of Joe Biden's certification as the winner of Pennsylvania's electoral votes in the 2020 United States presidential election, citing false claims of election irregularities.

Following redistricting, Lewis was moved to the 104th District, a more Democratic district than the 105th. Because of this, Lewis chose not to seek re-election in 2022.

Personal life 
Lewis lives in Lower Paxton Township, Dauphin County, Pennsylvania, with his wife, Ranae, and their three sons.

References

External links

Living people
Republican Party members of the Pennsylvania House of Representatives
People from Dauphin County, Pennsylvania
21st-century American politicians
1987 births